Stelmakh (Ukrainian: Стельмах) is a gender-neutral Ukrainian surname that may refer to the following notable people: 
Andrei Stelmakh (born 1990), Russian ice hockey goaltender
Grigory Stelmakh (1900–1942), Soviet military commander
Iryna Stelmakh (born 1993), Ukrainian handball player 
Mykhailo Stelmakh (1912–1983), Ukrainian novelist, poet, and playwright
Mykhailo Stelmakh (footballer) (born 1966), Ukrainian football manager and former player
Volodymyr Stelmakh (born 1939), Ukrainian banker, economist and politician

See also
 

Ukrainian-language surnames